The Utamikaneu River is a tributary of Dana Lake (Eeyou Istchee Baie-James), in Regional County Municipality (MRC) of Eeyou Istchee Baie-James (municipality), in the administrative region of Nord-du-Québec, in the Canadian province of Quebec, in Canada.

The surface of the river is usually frozen from early November to mid-May, however, safe ice circulation is generally from mid-November to mid-April.

Geography 
The main hydrographic slopes near the Utamikaneu River are:
 North side: Kauskatitineu River, Broadback River, Ouasouagami River;
 East side: Dana Lake (Eeyou Istchee Baie-James), Evans Lake, Broadback River;
 South side: Matawawaskweyau River, Pauschikushish Ewiwach River, Kapitastikweyack Creek;
 West side: Dodayer Lake, Desorsons Lake, Chaboullié Lake, Wemistikushiiuch Kawichitwaw Creek, Nottaway River.

The Utamikaneu River originates at the mouth of Utamikaneu Lake (length: altitude). This source is located at:
 West of the mouth of the Utamikaneu River (confluence with Dana Lake (Eeyou Istchee Baie-James);
 Southwest of the mouth of Dana Lake (Eeyou Istchee Baie-James) (confluence with Evans Lake);
 Southwest of the confluence of Evans Lake;
 Northwest of Lake Soscumica;
 East of the mouth of the Broadback River);
 North of downtown Matagami.
 
From his source, the "Utamikaneu River" flows on  according to the following segments:
 Southeast to a creek (coming from the southwest);
 Northeast to a creek (coming from the north);
 Easterly to its mouth.

The "Utamikaneu River" flows into the bottom of the West Bank Bay of Dana Lake (Eeyou Istchee Baie-James). The latter flows to the west shore of Evans Lake which is crossed to the North by the Broadback River.

The mouth of the Utamikaneu River is located at:
 Southwest of the mouth of Dana Lake (Eeyou Istchee Baie-James).
 Southwest of the mouth of Evans Lake (confluence with Broadback River);
 North of Lake Soscumica;
 East of the mouth of the Broadback River;
 North of downtown Matagami

Toponymy 
Of Cree origin, this hydronym means the river of the cheek.

The toponym "Utamikaneu River" was formalized on October 5, 1982 at the Commission de toponymie du Québec

References

See also 
James Bay
Broadback River, a watercourse
Evans Lake, a body of water
Dana Lake (Eeyou Istchee Baie-James), a body of water
List of rivers of Quebec

Rivers of Nord-du-Québec
Broadback River drainage basin
Eeyou Istchee James Bay